Hatkhiphong  is a river village in Bolikhamsai Province, in western Laos. It is the located in Borikhane District along the Nam Xan River, east of Borikham and south of Paodon.

References

Populated places in Bolikhamsai Province